The Kesarwani, also known as Kesarvani, Keshri  or Kesri, are sub bania caste found in India. They originated in the Kashmir region and are now found in other parts of northern India, to which they migrated during the Mughal era. 
Kesar refers to saffron, which they traded, and Wani refers to the Kashmiri caste to which they belong.

History and origin 
The Kesarwani were cultivators or traders of saffron (kesar in Hindustani) and originated from the Kashmir Valley of India. In the 12th century, many of the Kesarwani migrated to what today comprise the states of Bihar, Madhya Pradesh and Uttar Pradesh.

It is said that, as per a carved-engraved stone, found from Kashmir and presently available at the Pakistan Museum, that a group of people belonging to Kansal gotra of the Agrawal community from Punjab went to Kashmir in regard to Kesar trade and settled there. Gradually their population increased in the region and after the aforesaid incident, they migrated to Delhi and other parts of northern India. Considering this, Kesarwanis are nothing but Kansal-Gotri Agrawal Vaishy, who became Kesarwani because of their Kesar business in Kashmir.

See also 
 Vaishya
 Kashmiri Hindus

References

Social groups of Uttar Pradesh
Social groups of Jammu and Kashmir
Social groups of Madhya Pradesh
Social groups of Bihar
Indian castes
Kashmiri tribes
Bania communities
Vaishya community